The Assizes of Ariano were a series of laws for the Kingdom of Sicily promulgated in the summer of 1140 at Ariano, near Benevento, by Roger II of Sicily. Having recently pacified the peninsula, constantly in revolt, he had decided to make a move to more centralised government. The assizes established the large Sicilian bureaucracy and sought to maintain the feudal system under strict royal control. It contained forty clauses that touched on all possible topics of contemporary legal concern: private property, public property, the church, civil law, royal finances, and the military. The work was advanced for its day, deriving its precepts not only from Norman and French, but also Muslim and Byzantine (especially Justinian) legal theories.

The first half of 1140 was spent by Roger in Palermo preparing the Assizes. They were certainly well-planned. Despite having written the legislation in his capital, in July, he traveled in state to Salerno, the capital of the duchy of Apulia, and thence to Abruzzi, where he examined the conquests of his sons: Roger and Alfonso. These men, now duke of Apulia and prince of Capua respectively, had consolidated Norman rule over the peninsula and made it possible for the great feats of legislation that year. 

The Assizes affirm that the king is the only lawgiver in Sicily, that he is both judge and priest (as he holds the legatine powers from the pope), and all Sicilians were equal and under the same laws, whether Latin, Greek, Jew, or Muslim, Norman, Lombard, or Arab. It punished treason with death. It was also detailed in other crimes of violence: cowardice in battle, arming a mob, or withholding support from the king or his allies. Ecclesiastically, Christian heretics and apostates lost their rights. Bishops were excused from attendance at courts, though the king was granted override on this, as on everything, and there could be no appeals. Militarily, the knightly class was closed. Nobody could become a knight if had no knightly lineage. Finally, the assizes did not ignore the commoners and demanded that they be treated with justice and be burdened not unduly by their lords.

Roger's final act at Ariano was the issuance of a low-quality coinage standard for the entire realm, the ducat, taking its name from the duchy of Apulia. The coin, mostly copper and some silver, not gold as in later issuances, rapidly grew in importance.

The Assizes survive in two manuscripts, slightly differing from one another, though what are omissions and what additions is unknown. These were found in 1856 in the Vatican archives and those of Monte Cassino. 

The Assizes are the legislations promulgated by King Roger II of Sicily. Once his kingdom was consolidated he issued a series of laws, although it is unknown where or when he did this. It is presumed that the laws were issued around 1140, for it was only after this date that officials can be found all over the kingdom; before then they only appear sporadically.

At this time, Ariano was only an assembly of bishops and nobles and not a 'general assembly' in which all free men played a part. Important issues such as the military, obligations of vassals and the recognizance of the countries, and legislation was issued.

The Assizes survive in only two composite juridical manuscripts. The fullest text is that contained in Codice Vaticano Latino 8782, which can be dated back to the end of the twelfth century and which contains forty four assizes, as well as a prologue. The second the Codex 468 of the library of Montecassino dates from the first half of the thirteenth century. It transmits only an abbreviated version of the laws, although it also contains some additions and another seven assizes which are lacking in the Vatican manuscript.

The Assizes provide the first example of territorial legislation based upon Roman (Justinaic)  law, as "they precede, and were more important in practice than, the purely academic rediscovery  of Roman law." Roger's recourse to the example of the Roman emperors is indicative how ambitious his intentions were. The Assizes touch on only some aspects of the law: ecclesiastical, public, marriage and criminal. Alongside them customary law remained in force, unless it actual contradicted  what was in the Assizes. The reason for this was "because of the variety of different people subject to our rule." Therefore, the legislator was clearly very conscious of ruling over a multi-ethnic state; he respected the individual character of the various groups, although only insofar as this did not conflict with his overriding supervision.

References

Sources

Assizes of Ariano in Latin Original texts of both codices.
The consolidation of power: the Assizes of Ariano at Norman World by the European Commission.
Norwich, John Julius. The Kingdom in the Sun 1130-1194. Longman: London, 1970.
Pennington, Kenneth. "The Birth of the Ius commune: King Roger II's Legislation." Rivista internazionale del diritto comune, 17 (2006).

Medieval legal codes
12th century in the Kingdom of Sicily
Ariano Irpino
1140 in Europe
Legal history of Italy
Roger II of Sicily
12th century in law